Crystal Head Vodka is a brand of vodkas manufactured by Globefill Inc. in Newfoundland and Labrador, Canada. It was conceived and founded by actor Dan Aykroyd and artist John Alexander in September 2008. The vodkas are quadruple-distilled, filtered seven times and packaged in a Crystal Skull bottle.

History

Actor Dan Aykroyd and artist John Alexander conceived Crystal Head Vodka in 2008. Due to the lack of additive-free vodka on the market, Aykroyd decided to make one himself. Alexander designed the bottle based on the pair's shared fascination with the legend of the thirteen crystal skulls.

In 2010, the Liquor Control Board of Ontario refused to carry Crystal Head Vodka in its stores, saying that people might find the bottle offensive. They reversed their decision after a change was made to the box design.

In May 2011, 21,000 bottles of the vodka were stolen from a warehouse in Southern California. Aykroyd joked that he was "happy that some consumers will be afforded the opportunity of tasting it at significantly lower than retail price".

As of 2013, Aykroyd was spending over 90 days a year on the road promoting the vodka through signings and appearances. The brand was the official vodka of the Rolling Stones' 50th Anniversary Tour in 2013.

Varieties
As of November 2020, three varieties of the vodka are for sale. The original formula, which comes in a colorless bottle, is made from Canadian “Peaches and Cream” sweet corn.

The second formula, known as Aurora, is made from English wheat and has a flavor described as drier and spicier than the original. The Aurora bottle has an opalescent finish that is meant to evoke the aurora borealis.

The most recent addition to the line, introduced in October 2020, is a blue agave based vodka branded as "Crystal Head Onyx" and comes in a black bottle.  The blue agave is grown in Mexico's Jalisco region, and is one of the first agave-based vodkas available commercially.  All three varieties are made with Newfoundland water.

Bottle design
The defect rate on the bottle production is about 40% on the 750 ml bottle. 

In 2014, forensic artist Nigel Cockerton used clay to make a muscle, skin and hair construction on one of the skull bottles to see what it would look like if the bottle had been an actual person. The result resembled a laughing man. Dan Aykroyd was pleased with the face, although he had previously thought of the bottle as being feminine due to its size, and had nicknamed the bottle Joy due to the joy it brought him. He said he was relieved that the face didn't turn out to look like him.

In 2018, the limited edition John Alexander artist series was created, in commemoration of the tenth year of business. Only 25,000 bottles were produced. They are hand decorated with John Alexander's expressive painting “Dancing on the waterlilies of life”.

In 2020, Crystal Head Vodka released its limited-edition rainbow-hued Pride bottle in celebration of diversity, equality and to show support for the LGBTQ+ community.

Production

Crystal Head Vodka is manufactured by Globefill Incorporated at the Newfoundland and Labrador Liquor Corporation distillery called Rock Spirits in Newfoundland, Canada. Ontario sweet corn grown in the Chatham-Kent region of Ontario is processed and distilled four times and not aged, to produce a neutral grain spirit at 95% alcohol by volume. The raw spirit is then reduced with Newfoundland water to 40% alcohol by volume. The liquid is then filtered seven times with the final three filtrations through Herkimer diamond crystals, which are actually a type of double-terminated quartz rather than diamond. Crystal Head does not use any additives in the production of their vodka. The factory and product is certified kosher, as well as gluten-free.

References

External links

 
 Interview with Aykroyd about the product

Canadian brands
Canadian vodkas
Dan Aykroyd
Canadian companies established in 2008